Kannauj City railway station is a railway station in Kannauj district, Uttar Pradesh. Its code is KJNC. It will serve Kannauj city. The station has two platforms.

References

Railway stations in Kannauj district
Izzatnagar railway division
Kannauj